Fretibacterium is a genus of bacteria from the family of Synergistaceae with one known species (Fretibacterium fastidiosum). Fretibacterium fastidiosum has been isolated from subgingival plaque.

References

Synergistota
Bacteria genera
Monotypic bacteria genera